The Furness Railway and its antecedent companies had at different times a number of halts and non-public timetable stations.  Halts were small, unstaffed stations with few, if any, facilities. Non-public timetable stations were stations that did not feature in the publicly advertised railway timetable and were, for example, for internal railway use only or only served by excursion trains rather than regular services.

References

Furness Railway